Human rights in the Gambia have been considered poor under Yahya Jammeh. In December, 2016, he lost an election to Adama Barrow, who promised to improve human rights in his country. The "Freedom in the World" report for 2018 ranked the Gambia as "partly free". LGBT activity is illegal, and punishable with life imprisonment.

See also
 Human trafficking in the Gambia
 LGBT rights in the Gambia

References 

 
Gambia